The 5th Robert Awards ceremony was held in 1988 in Copenhagen, Denmark. Organized by the Danish Film Academy, the awards honoured the best in Danish and foreign film of 1987.

Honorees

Best Danish Film 
 Pelle the Conqueror – Bille August

Best Screenplay 
 Bille August – Pelle the Conqueror

Best Actor in a Leading Role 
 Max von Sydow – Pelle the Conqueror

Best Actress in a Leading Role 
 Stéphane Audran – Babettes gæstebud

Best Actor in a Supporting Role 
 Björn Granath – Pelle the Conqueror

Best Actress in a Supporting Role 
 Lene Brøndum – Pelle the Conqueror

Best Cinematography 
 Jörgen Persson – Pelle the Conqueror

Best Production Design 
 Anna Asp – Pelle the Conqueror

Best Sound Design 
 Niels Arild Nielsen & Lars Lund – Pelle the Conqueror

Best Editing 
  - Pelle the Conqueror

Best Documentary Short 
 Ansigt til ansigt -

Best Short Featurette 
 En hård dags nat – Elisabeth Rygård

See also 

 1988 Bodil Awards

References

External links 
  

1987 film awards
1988 in Denmark
Robert Awards ceremonies
1980s in Copenhagen